Calvin Armstrong (born March 31, 1982) is a former American football offensive lineman. He was originally drafted by the Philadelphia Eagles in the sixth round of the 2005 NFL Draft. He has also played in the CFL for the Edmonton Eskimos and the Toronto Argonauts. He played college football at Washington State.

Early years
Armstrong attended Centralia High School where he stood out in football and basketball.

College career
At Washington State University, Armstrong was a two time All-Pac-10 player and an integral member of 2002 WSU Rose Bowl team and 2003 Holiday Bowl team.

External links
Arizona Rattlers bio

1982 births
Living people
American football offensive tackles
Canadian football offensive linemen
Edmonton Elks players
Green Bay Packers players
People from Centralia, Washington
Players of American football from Washington (state)
Philadelphia Eagles players
Washington Redskins players
Washington State Cougars football players